Terra may often refer to:
 Terra (mythology), primeval Roman goddess
 An alternate name for planet Earth, as well as the Latin name for the planet

Terra may also refer to:

Geography

Astronomy 
 Terra (satellite), a multi-national NASA scientific research satellite
 Terrae, extensive land masses found on various solar system bodies
 List of terrae on Mars
 List of terrae on Venus
 Terra, a highland on the Moon (Luna)
 Terrestrial (disambiguation), things related to land or the planet Earth

Latin and other 
 Terra Australis (southern land), hypothetical continent appearing on maps from the 15th to the 18th century
 Terra incognita, unknown land, for regions that have not been mapped or documented
 Terra nullius, land belonging to no one, nobody's land, empty or desolate land
 Terra preta ("black earth"), very dark, fertile anthropogenic soil found in the Amazon Basin

Places
 Terra, Cyprus, a village in the Paphos District of Cyprus
 Terra Alta, West Virginia, a former coal town in Preston County

Nature
 Terra (butterfly), genus
 TERRA (biology), TElomeric Repeat-containing RNA: RNA resulting from telomere transcription

People

Given name
 Terra Deva, American actress, singer-songwriter, dancer, and former Mickey Mouse Club member
 Terra Findlay (born 1990), Canadian ice dancer
 Terra Hazelton, Canadian broadcaster, jazz musician, and actress
 Terra Jolé, reality television personality
 Terra Lawson-Remer, American politician, economist, and professor
 Terra Lightfoot, Canadian musician and singer-songwriter
 Terra Naomi (born 1974), American musician and singer-songwriter
 Terra Wellington, American actress
 Han Terra (born 1981), Korean musician and inventor

Other
 Gabriel Terra (1873–1942), Uruguayan president
 Terra Ryzing, one of the names given to professional wrestler Triple H

Fictional characters
 Terra, a playable Goddess in Smite (video game) as a Roman Guardian
 Terra Branford, a female character from Final Fantasy VI
 Terra (Kingdom Hearts), a male character from the video game franchise Kingdom Hearts
 Terra (character), a name used by three characters in DC Comics

Books
 Terra (German science fiction), a science fiction series published by Arthur Moewig Verlag, Munich
 The Terra Trilogy, a series of Young Adult SF novels by Mitch Benn, consisting of Terra (2013), Terra's World (2014) and Terra's War (2021)
 Terra Nostra (novel) (Our Earth), a 1975 historical novel on Hispanic history by Mexican author Carlos Fuentes

Film and TV
 Terra Film, German film company
 La Terra (film), 2006 Italian film
 Battle for Terra, a 2007 science fiction animated movie originally screened as Terra
 Terra, in the anime RahXephon

Games
 Terra (video game), 1996
 Terra, a fictional universe in Final Fantasy IX
 Holy Terra, the name for Earth, as the capital of the Imperium of Man, in the table top strategy and RPG game Warhammer 40,000.
 Terra, a fictional planet in Crash Nitro Kart (2003)

Music
 Terra (band), a Japanese band
 Terra (Cronian album)
 Terra (Mariza album)
 Terra (Jenni Vartiainen album)
 Terra, an album by Laura Macrì 
 TeRra (Live), an album by TeRra Han
 La Terra (album), by Aktuala

Business and brands
 Terra (proposed currency), proposed global currency
 Terra (blockchain), a blockchain on which the TerraUSD and Luna cryptocurrencies are built
 Terra Chips, a food brand owned by Hain Celestial Group 
 Terra-Gruppen, Norwegian savings banks
 Terra (company), Spanish multinational media and internet company
 Nissan Terra, a sport utility vehicle manufactured by Nissan Motor Corporation

See also
 Tellus (disambiguation)
 Tera (disambiguation)
 Terra Alta (disambiguation)
 Terra Nova (disambiguation)
 Terrain
 Terran (disambiguation)
 Territory
 Terrain